Malinda Elliott Cramer (February 12, 1844 – August 2, 1906) was a founder of the Church of Divine Science, a healer, and an important figure in the early New Thought movement.

Biography 

Cramer was born in Greensboro, Indiana, the daughter of Obediah and Mary Hinshaw Elliott.  Hoping to alleviate a persistent health problem, she moved to San Francisco in 1872, where she met Charles Lake Cramer, a photographer, whom she married in 1872.  Despite the move, health problems continued to plague her, making her an effective invalid.

In 1885, perhaps under the impetus of Christian Scientist Miranda Rice, Cramer had what she described as a divine revelation after an "hour of earnest mediation and prayerful seeking" and "that hour was the beginning of my realization of the oneness of Life, [and] a gleam of its Truth flashed across my mental vision". Within two years she was healed.

Divine Science 

In 1887, she began to practice faith-healing herself.  In October 1888, Cramer inaugurated Harmony, a monthly journal.  In May 1888, she and her husband opened what would become the Home College of Divine Science.  The term "Divine Science", however, was not coined by Cramer, but had been used earlier by Mary Baker Eddy, founder of Christian Science, as well as by Wilberforce Juvenal Colville, who had published a book by that title that year.

In 1892, Cramer founded the International Divine Science Association, a forerunner of the International New Thought Alliance, which would interconnect the various New Thought centers.  In 1893, she helped open the second Divine Science College, in Oakland, and undertook several cross-country missionary trips.

Between 1893 and 1898, Cramer trained Nona L. Brooks, ordaining her as a minister in the Church of Divine Science on December 1, 1898.  Brooks returned to Denver and, with sisters Fannie Brooks James and Alethea Brooks Small, formed a church there, one which would eventually become the home church of the denomination.

Cramer died August 2, 1906, in San Francisco, due to  a recurrence of her tuberculosis as a result of the aftermath of the great San Francisco earthquake.

Bibliography
Malinda Cramer was the author of several books, including:

Divine Science And Healing.
Originally published as  Lessons in the Science of Infinite Spirit, and the Christ Method of Healing by C. W. Gordon (San Francisco) 1890.
Revised edition was published as Divine Science and Healing C. L. Cramer (San Francisco, CA), 1902.
In 1905, published as  Divine Science and Healing: A Text-book for the Study of Divine Science, Its Application in Healing, and for the Well-being of Each Individual], Home College of Divine Science (San Francisco).
In 1957, published as Divine Science: Its Principles and Practice, Fannie B. James, ed., Divine Science Federation Int'l, (Denver), 1957.Hidden HarmonyPublished as Malinda Cramer's Hidden Harmony, Joan Cline-McCrary, ed., Divine Science Federation International (Denver), 1990.Basic Statements and Health Treatment of Truth: A System of Instruction in Divine Science and Its Application in Healing and for Class Training, Home and Private Use, 1893.
Eighth edition, 1905.

 References 

 Further reading 

Cramer, Malinda (1923) [https://books.google.com/books?id=jjCaKKsOmzwC Divine Science and Healing, Colorado College of Divine Science, Denver.
First Divine Science Church of Denver, "Centennial", accessed May 2008.

Divine Science page on Malinda Cramer, accessed May 2008.
Gale Publishing (2008) "Malinda Cramer" in Contemporary Authors Online. Reproduced in Biography Resource Center. Farmington Hills, Mich.: Gale, 2008. http://galenet.galegroup.com/servlet/BioRC.  Accessed May 2008.
Gale Publishing (2008) "Nona Lovell Brooks" and "Malinda Cramer" in Religious Leaders of America. Reproduced in Biography Resource Center. Farmington Hills, Mich.: Gale, 2008. http://galenet.galegroup.com/servlet/BioRC.  Accessed May 2008.
Satter, Beryl (2001) Each Mind a Kingdom: American Women, Sexual Purity, and the New Thought Movement, 1875-1920, University of California Press, .
Spiritual Enlightenment.org, accessed May 2008.

1844 births
1906 deaths
Writers from Indiana
New Thought writers
New Thought mystics
Divine Science clergy
19th-century American writers
19th-century American women writers
19th-century Christian mystics
Natural disaster deaths in California
Tuberculosis deaths in California
20th-century deaths from tuberculosis
Deaths in earthquakes